The Hunchback of Soho is a 1966 West German crime film directed by Alfred Vohrer and starring Günther Stoll, Pinkas Braun and Monika Peitsch.

It was part of Rialto Film's long-running group of Edgar Wallace adaptations, and was the first in the series to be shot in Eastmancolor. It was made at the Spandau Studios and on location in Berlin and London.

Plot

Scotland Yard investigate a series of murders at a castle which is now being used as a girls school.

Cast
 Günther Stoll as Inspektor Hopkins
 Monika Peitsch as Wanda Merville
 Pinkas Braun as Alan Davis
 Eddi Arent as Reverend David
 Siegfried Schürenberg as Sir John
 Agnes Windeck as Lady Marjorie Perkins
 Gisela Uhlen as Mrs. Tyndal
 Hubert von Meyerinck as General Edward Perkins
 Uta Levka as Gladys Gardner
 Suzanne Roquette as Laura
 Joachim Teege as Lawyer Harold Stone
 Hilde Sessak as Oberin
 Susanne Hsiao as Viola
 Kurt Waitzmann as Sergeant
 Ilse Pagé as Jane
 Albert Bessler as Butler Anthony
 Richard Haller as Der Bucklige

Reception

Dave Sindelar from Fantastic Movie Musings and Ramblings felt that by shooting the film in color it "stripped the series of one of its strengths", also criticizing the film's first half, score, and dubbing. Andrew Pragasam from The Spinning Image awarded the film six out of ten stars, noting the film's uneven narrative, but stated that its mixture of humor and horror was still entertaining.

References

Bibliography 
 Bock, Hans-Michael & Bergfelder, Tim. The Concise CineGraph. Encyclopedia of German Cinema. Berghahn Books, 2009.

External links 
 
 
 

1966 films
1960s mystery films
1960s crime thriller films
German mystery thriller films
German crime thriller films
West German films
1960s German-language films
Films directed by Alfred Vohrer
Constantin Film films
Films set in London
Color sequels of black-and-white films
Films based on British novels
Films based on works by Edgar Wallace
Films shot at Spandau Studios
1960s German films